Gymnostoma nobile is a species of tree endemic to northern Borneo.

Gymnostoma nobile is native to heath forests, also known as kerangas forests, which grow on nutrient-poor soils. It is a nitrogen-fixing plant.

References

nobile
Plants described in 1982
Endemic flora of Borneo
Flora of the Sundaland heath forests